Thur Deephrey (pronounced "thirty-three") (born Serge Lawrence Jr.), also known as Lawrence Tripp and Myríad, is an experimental music producer and DJ from Kyiv, currently residing in Germany. Thur Deephrey has been djing shows in Europe and the US for almost a decade now, sharing the stage with the likes of Okta Logue, Allah-Las, The Growlers, Forever Pavot, Embryo, Damo Suzuki, Sugar Candy Mountain & Michael Nau, as well as producing and recording his own, beat heavy, experimental music. Besides being a regular on Red Light Radio in Amsterdam and dublab.de, he frequently co-hosts Munich’s notorious Psychedelic Porn Funk Party with Behind the Green Door Events. Besides spinning with original vinyl, Thur Deephrey incorporates all types of samplers, effects, edits, percussions and self-produced beats to go beyond the regular DJ set and add to the trip.

Discography

Mixes/Compilations

 (2010)
 (2010)
 (2013)
 (2016)
 (2017)
 (2017)
 (2019)
 (2019)

References

External links
  at Facebook
  at Bandcamp
  at SoundCloud
  at Instagram
  at Discogs

German record producers
Hip hop record producers
Living people
Psychedelic rock musicians
Ukrainian DJs
Musicians from Kyiv
Year of birth missing (living people)
German DJs